Mysore Jaana is a 1992 Indian Kannada-language-language romantic drama film produced & directed by A. T. Raghu and written by H. V. Subba Rao. The film stars Ambareesh, Vinaya Prasad and Anjana with Doddanna, Vajramuni, Mukhyamantri Chandru, Sudheer and Lohithaswa in key supporting roles.

The film's music was composed by Rajan–Nagendra and the audio was launched on the Sangeetha music banner.

Cast 
 Ambareesh
 Vinaya Prasad
 Anjana
 Vajramuni
 Doddanna
 Mukhyamantri Chandru
 Lohithaswa
 Sudheer
 Rajanand
 Usha Ganesh
 Kaminidharan
 Umashri
 Master Sunil
 Mysore Lokesh
 Chikkanna
 Negro Johnny

Soundtrack 
The music of the film was composed by Rajan–Nagendra and lyrics written by R. N. Jayagopal.

References 

1992 films
1990s Kannada-language films
Indian romantic drama films
Films scored by Rajan–Nagendra
1992 romantic drama films
Films shot in Mysore